was a Japanese actor best known for playing rebels in a career that spanned six decades.

Career
Born in Tokyo, Harada joined the Haiyuza Theatre Company in 1966 and made his television debut in 1967 with "Tenka no seinen" and his film debut in 1968 with Fukushū no uta ga kikoeru. He came to fame appearing in New Action films at Nikkatsu playing youthful rebels. Among his features for Nikkatsu was the 1971 exploitation film, Stray Cat Rock: Crazy Riders '71 (aka Alleycat Rock: Crazy Riders '71) for director Toshiya Fujita where he played the son of a yakuza boss.

Leaving the Haiyūza in 1971, he appeared in films made by many directors, including Seijun Suzuki, Shūji Terayama, Azuma Morisaki, Kihachi Okamoto, Rokurō Mochizuki, Jun Ichikawa, Hirokazu Koreeda and Kōji Wakamatsu, but he was particularly favored by Kazuo Kuroki and Junji Sakamoto. He starred in many independent films, including those of the Art Theatre Guild. According to the critic Mark Schilling, Harada was "a favorite of generations of Japanese helmers for his rugged features, low, rumbling voice and distinctive presence, with shades of darkness and wildness that made him a natural for antihero roles in his youth." Harada also appeared in many television dramas.

He died by Colorectal cancer on 19 July 2011 while battling cancer. His last starring film was Someday, and it was at a press conference for that film on 11 July that he made his last public appearance.

Awards
A veteran of over 80 films, Harada won the best actor award at the 1990 Blue Ribbon Awards for Ronin-gai and Ware ni Utsu Yōi Ari. He had earlier won the Blue Ribbon best supporting actor prize in 1975 for Matsuri no junbi. He also won the best actor prize at the Mainichi Film Awards in 1997 for Onibi, and the Hochi Film Award for best supporting actor in 1989 for Dotsuitarunen. He was twice nominated for the Best Actor Japanese Academy Award and won the award for best supporting actor at the 11th Yokohama Film Festival for Dotsuitarunen and Kiss yori kantan.

He received a Medal of Honor with Purple Ribbon from the Japanese government in 2003.

Selected filmography

Film

 Fukushū no Uta ga Kikoeru (1968)
 Hangyaku no Melody (1970) – Tetsu Tsukada
 Shinjuku outlaw: Step On the Gas (1970)
 Nora-neko rokku: Bôsô shûdan '71 (1971) – Pirania
 Kantō Exile (1971)
 Hachigatsu no nureta suna (1971) – Priest
 Kanto Kanbu-kai (1971)
 Mushukunin Mikogami no Jôkichi (1972–1973, part 1-3) – Jokichi of Mikogami
 Akai tori nigeta? (1973) – Hiroshi Bando
 Lady Snowblood 2: Love Song of Vengeance (1974) – Shusuke Tokunaga
 Ryoma Ansatsu (1974) – Ryoma Sakamoto
 Pastoral: To Die in the Country (1974) – Arashi
 Preparation for the Festival (1975) – Toshihiro Nakajima
 Yasagure Keiji (1976)
 Kimi yo funnu no kawa wo watare (1976) – Detective Yamura
 Yasagure deka (1976)
 Han gyakû no tabi (1976)
 A Tale of Sorrow and Sadness (1977) – Mr. Miyake
 Ballad of Orin (1977) – Big Man
 Shogun's Samurai (1978) – Sanza Nagoya (Flute Player)
 Genshiryoku sensô (1978) – Sakata
 Inubue (1978) – Kanji Mitsueda
 Orenji Rôdo kyûkô (1978)
 Mahiru nari (1978) – Man
 Yorû gaku zuretâ (1978)
 Hunter in the Dark (1979) – Yataro Tanigawa
 Ana no kiba (1979)
 Zigeunerweisen (1980) – Nakasago
 Yūgure made (1980) – Restaurant owner
 Disciples of Hippocrates (1980) – Tokumatsu
 Misuta, Misesu, Misu Ronri (1980) – Eisuke Misaki
 Slow na boogie ni shitekure (1981) – Teruo Miyazato
 Kagero-za (1981) – Wada
 Mizu no nai puuru (1982) – Owner
 Tattoo Ari (1982)
 Manji (1983) – Takeshi Kakeuchi
 Namidabashi (1983) – Shuzo
 Sukanpin walk (1984) – Tsutomu yahagi
 Umitsubame Jyo no kiseki (1984) – Yonamine
 Farewell to the Ark (1984) – Daisaki Tokito
 Ikiteru uchiga hana nanoyo shin-dara sore madeyo to sengen (1985) – Isamu Miyazato
 Tomo yo shizukani nemure (1985) – Jiro Takahata
 Tosha 1/250 Byo Out of Focus (1985)
 Kyabarê (1986) – Shirae
 Comic Magazine (1986) – Producer
 Birî za kiddo no atarashii yoake (1986) – Harry Callahan
 Aitsu ni Koishite
 Chōchin (1987)
 Kono aino monogatari (1987)
 Saraba itoshiki hito yo (1987) – Owner of Disco
 Tomorrow – ashita (1988) – Yamaguchi
 Hotaru (1989) – Hashimoto
 Yumemi-dôri no hitobito (1989)
 Nijisseiki shônen dokuhon (1989) – Yoshimoto
 Shucchou (1989)
 Dotsuitarunen (1989) – Makio Sajima
 Kiss yori kantan (1989)
 Ronin-gai (1990) – Gen'nai Aramaki
 Ready to Shoot (1990) – Katsuhiko Goda
 Tekken (1990)
 Shishiohtachi no natsu (1991)
 Rasuto Furankenshutain (1991)
 Yumeji (1991) – Wakiya
 Muno no Hito (1991) – Homeless
 Kiss yori kantan 2: hyoryuhen (1991)
 The Triple Cross (1992) – Noji
 Netorare Sosuke (1992) – Sosuke Kitamura
 Singapore Sling (1993)
 Rampo (1994) – Big Star
 The Hunted (1995) – Takeda Sensei
 The Girl of Silence (1995) – Shizuo Tanaka
 Umihoozuki (1995)
 Nemureru bijo (1995) – Yoshio Eguchi
 Kagerô II (1996) – Susumu Sawada
 Onibi (1997) – Noriyuki Kunihiro
 Koi gokudo (1997)
 The Story of PuPu (1998)
 Big show! Hawaii ni utaeba (1999) – Tashiro
 Anaza hevun (2000) – Detective Tobitaka
 Zawa-zawa Shimo-Kitazawa (2000) – Kyushiro
 Suri (2000)
 Party 7 (2000) – Captain Banana
 KT (2002) – Akikazu Kamikawa
 Onna kunishuu ikki (2002)
 Kyoki no sakura (2002) – Aota Shuzo
 Utsukushii natsu kirishima (2002) – Shigenori Hidaka
 Azumi (2003) – Gessai Obata
 9 Souls (2003) – Torakichi Hasegawa
 Shôwa kayô daizenshû (2003) – Hirota – the Shop Owner in Gunma
 Kantoku kansen (2003)
 Tengoku no honya – koibi (2004) – Yamaki
 The Face of Jizo (2004) – Takezou
 Izo (2004)
 Heaven's Bookstore (2004) – Mamoru Ohama
 Drawing Restraint 9 (2005) – Flensing Deck Crew
 Azumi 2 (2005)
 Aegis (2005) – Koichiro Kajimoto
 Uôtâzu (2006) – Owner
 Hana (2006) – Junai Onodera
 Nightmare Detective (2006) – Keizo Oishi
 Nippon no jitensha dorobô (2006)
 Dororo (2007) – Jukai
 Jitsuroku Rengo Sekigun: Asama sanso e no michi (2007) – (voice)
 Orion-za kara no shôtaijô (2007) – Tomekichi Senba – old
 Little DJ: Chiisana koi no monogatari (2007) – Yuji Takasaki
 Tamio no shiawase (2008) – Nobuo Kanzaki
 Still Walking (2008) – Kyohei Yokoyama
 Hotaru no haka (2008) – Maichi Kaicho of Nishimiya
 Ultra Miracle Love Story (2009) – Dr. Misawa
 Ôgonka: Hisureba hana, shisureba chô (2009)
 Zatoichi: The Last (2010) – Genkichi
 Rosuto kuraimu: Senkô (2010)
 I Wish (2011) – Wataru (Grandfather's Friend)
 Someday (2011) – Yoshi Kazamatsuri (final film role)

Television
 Haru no Sakamichi (1971) – Yagyū Jūbei Mitsuyoshi
 Tsūkai! Kōchiyama Sōshun (1975–1976)
 Natsu ni Koisuru Onnatachi (1983) – Daisuke Mizushima
 "Seibu Keisatsu PART-III Final Special "Daimon dies! Men forever ..." (October 22, 1984, TV Asahi ) --Reiji Fujisaki
 Dokuganryū Masamune (1987) – Mogami Yoshiaki
 Suna no Utsuwa (2004) - Chiyokichi Motoura
 Fumō Chitai (2009) – Ichizō Daimon
 Hi no Sakana (2009) – Shozō Murata
 Kokosei Restaurant (2011) – Sadatoshi Muraki

Honours
Medal with Purple Ribbon (2003)
Order of the Rising Sun, 4th Class, Gold Rays with Rosette (2011)

References

External links

 
 

1940 births
2011 deaths
Male actors from Tokyo
Recipients of the Medal with Purple Ribbon
Recipients of the Order of the Rising Sun, 4th class
Deaths from pneumonia in Japan